James Burton (born 1939) is an American guitarist.

James Burton may also refer to:

Sportspeople
 James Burton (American football) (born 1972), former defensive back for the Chicago Bears
 Jim Burton (baseball) (1949–2013), American baseball player
 Jim Burton (ice hockey) (1963–2015), retired professional ice hockey defenceman

Others
 James Burton (conductor) (born 1974), British conductor and composer
 James Burton (Egyptologist) (1788–1862), English Egyptologist
 James Burton (millowner) (1784–1868), English mill owner
 James Burton (priest) (1745–1825), English clergyman and canon of Christ Church, Oxford
 James Burton (property developer) (1761–1837), British property developer and architect
 James G. Burton, retired USAF colonel and author of The Pentagon Wars: Reformers Challenge the Old Guard
 James H. Burton (1823–1895), Confederate soldier 
 James Ryder Burton (died 1876), British Royal Navy officer
 James Burton, the protagonist of the popular Gradius series and the most recurring character piloting the Vic Viper

See also
 James Burton Telecaster, an electric guitar made by Fender
 James Burton Coffman (1905–2006), American preacher
 James Burton Robertson (1800–1877), English historian